Myrodato is a settlement in the Abdera municipal unit, Xanthi regional unit of Greece. It is located two kilometers west of Abdera. Its population was 492 at the 2011 census. In 1981, the settlement had a population of around 668 inhabitants. In 1991, the population of Myrodato slightly rose to about 671 inhabitants.

Myrodato beach is also 7 km away from the village of Myrodato.

References

External links
Greek Travel Pages - Myrodato

Populated places in Xanthi (regional unit)